The California Department of Aging (CDA) is a California state department that oversees the execution of the Older Californians Act and the Older Americans Act. It is nominally under the auspices of the California Health and Human Services Agency. It is headquartered in Sacramento. As of October 2021, the California Department of Aging is being led by director Susan DeMarois. DeMarois previously served as the Director of Public Policy and Advocacy for the Alzheimer's Association.

References

External links
 
 California Department of Aging in the California Code of Regulations

Aging